The Northern Collegiate Hockey Association (NCHA) is a college athletic conference which operates in Illinois, Indiana, Michigan, Minnesota, and Wisconsin in the midwestern United States.  It participates in the NCAA's Division III as a hockey-only conference.

The conference was founded in 1980 as a loose association of six schools in Minnesota and northwestern Wisconsin.  The league was formalized the next year.

In the summer of 2012, the five schools in the University of Wisconsin System announced that they would leave the conference to begin playing hockey in their all-sports conference, the Wisconsin Intercollegiate Athletic Conference.  The move would have left only two men's teams in the NCHA, leading St. Norbert and St. Scholastica to join the Midwest Collegiate Hockey Association (MCHA).  In April 2013, the NCHA and MCHA announced a merger, where the NCHA would absorb the MCHA's teams (of the MCHA's 10 schools, all 7 who also sponsored women's hockey played in the NCHA).  The men's and women's sides will retain separate administrative structures, as well as their automatic bids to the NCAA Tournament.

Members

Current

Former

Membership timeline

Champions

Men

Women

^ Won National Championship

Arenas

See also
Harris Cup

References

External links
Official web site